Pearl Peak is a  summit in the southern part of the Ruby Mountains, in Elko County, Nevada in the United States. The peak, which is within the Humboldt-Toiyabe National Forest, is primarily composed of Ordovician to early Devonian dolomite and limestone, with minor amounts of sandstone and quartzite. It hosts a stand of bristlecone pine.

The Ruby Lake National Wildlife Refuge is located a short distance to the southeast.

See also
List of mountain peaks of Nevada

References

Mountains of Nevada
Mountains of Elko County, Nevada
North American 3000 m summits